The 1991 German Athletics Championships was the 91st edition of the national championship in outdoor track and field for Germany. It was held on 26–28 July at the Niedersachsenstadion in Hannover. It served as the selection meeting for Germany at the 1991 World Championships in Athletics. It marked the resumption of an all-Germany national competition for athletes from East Germany and West Germany, following the fall of the Berlin Wall. The merged competition programme followed that of the 1990 West German Athletics Championships, with the only amendment being the inclusion of a women's team aspect to the mountain running championship.

Championships
As usual, due to time or organizational reasons, various competitions were not held as part of the main event in Hannover. The annual national championships in Germany held separately from the main track and field competition comprised the following:

Results

Men

Women

References 
General
 Fritz Steinmetz: Deutsche Leichtathletik-Meisterschaften Band 4 (1988–1993). Hornberger-Verlag, Waldfischbach 1994
 Zeitschrift Leichtathletik DSV Deutscher Sportverlag Köln, Jahrgang 1991, Ausgaben mit Ergebnislisten zu den verschiedenen Wettkampfergebnissen bei Deutschen Leichtathletikmeisterschaften 1991
Results

External links 
 Official website of the German Athletics Association 

1992
Sports competitions in Hanover
Athletics Championships
German Championships
Athletics Championships